Ralph Dale Earnhardt Jr. (born October 10, 1974) also known as “Dale Jr.” or simply, “Junior” is an American professional stock car racing driver. He competes occasionally in the NASCAR Xfinity Series, driving the No. 88 Chevrolet Camaro for his team JR Motorsports. A third generation driver, he is the son of 7-time NASCAR Cup Series champion Dale Earnhardt Sr. and relative to many former and current drivers in the NASCAR ranks. 

After driving the No. 8 Chevrolet for Dale Earnhardt, Inc. (DEI), his father's team in the NASCAR Cup Series, for much of his early Cup career, he moved to Hendrick Motorsports to drive the No. 88 in 2008. He remained with Hendrick until his last season as a full-time driver in 2017. Earnhardt has 26 wins in the Cup Series, a total that ranks him tied for 31st in NASCAR history (with Fred Lorenzen and Joey Logano) as of January 2023. He is a two-time champion of the Xfinity Series, winning in 1998 and 1999. Since his last season in Cup, Earnhardt has worked as a broadcaster for NASCAR on NBC.

Earnhardt's success at Daytona International Speedway throughout his career earned him the nickname "Pied Piper" of Daytona. He is a two-time Daytona 500 winner (2004 and 2014), and has won the Most Popular Driver Award fifteen consecutive times from 2003 to 2017.

Racing career

Early life and career
Dale Earnhardt Jr. was born and raised in Kannapolis, North Carolina, the son of Brenda Lorraine Jackson and Dale Earnhardt Sr. His maternal grandfather, Robert Gee Sr., was a NASCAR car builder. He has an elder sister, Kelley; an elder half-brother, Kerry, from his father's first marriage; and a younger half-sister, Taylor Earnhardt-Putnam, from his father's third marriage. He is of part German ancestry. His parents divorced shortly after he was born, and he and Kelley lived with Brenda Earnhardt until their house was destroyed in a fire when he was six years old. As Brenda had no financial support after the fire, she gave up custody of the two children to Earnhardt Sr. prior to his marriage to Teresa Houston. During Dale Earnhardt Jr.'s childhood, Kelley took care of him while their father and stepmother were busy with the race seasons. At the age of 12, he was sent to Oak Ridge Military Academy; three weeks later, Kelley quit high school to join him. He considered remaining at Oak Ridge for his senior year, but instead decided to attend Mooresville High School, from which he graduated in 1992.

Earnhardt Jr. attended the high performance driving school run by Andy Hillenburg and began his racing career at the late age of 17 with his father, competing in the Street Stock division at Concord, North Carolina's Motorsport Park. His first race car was a 1979 Monte Carlo that he co-owned with Kerry. By age 19, after two seasons of driving Street Stock Division, Earnhardt Jr. had honed his driving abilities to the point of joining the Late Model Stock Car Division. He competed on the North and South Carolina short tracks driving a No. 3 Buick. While he did run various tracks during this time, Earnhardt Jr. primarily focused his efforts at the Myrtle Beach Speedway in South Carolina and the East Carolina Motor Speedway in Robersonville, North Carolina, where he captured the pole for the Greenville Merchants 300 on October 28, 1994. There, he developed an in-depth knowledge of chassis setup and car preparation, while racing against his siblings. He worked at his father's dealership as a mechanic while he went to Mitchell Community College to earn an associate degree in automotive technology.

Earnhardt Jr. ran nine Busch Series races between 1996 and 1997 for Dale Earnhardt, Inc., and Ed Whitaker, respectively, before driving for his father's team in the Busch Series full-time in 1998, in which he started the season with an amazing blow over after contact with Dick Trickle and Buckshot Jones at Daytona, on the same weekend that his father had his first and only Daytona 500 win. Earnhardt won consecutive NASCAR Busch Series Championships in 1998 and 1999 barely edging Matt Kenseth. In 1998, he made his first start in the Winston Cup Series, at the exhibition race held at the Twin Ring Motegi in Japan. Also in 1999, he drove in five Winston Cup races in the No. 8 Budweiser-sponsored Chevrolet for DEI in preparation for a full-time Cup Series ride in 2000, with his best finish being a tenth-place finish at Richmond in the fall race.

2000

The 2000 season was Earnhardt's breakout year in the Winston Cup Series. He competed for the Raybestos NASCAR Rookie of the Year Award in 2000. His primary competitor for the award was Matt Kenseth. Kenseth outran Earnhardt in the season-opening Daytona 500. Earnhardt scored his first win in the DirecTV 500 at Texas Motor Speedway, breaking the record held by his father Earnhardt Sr. for fewest starts by a driver to earn his first victory in NASCAR's "modern era" by winning in his 12th start, and also at Richmond International Raceway. He became the first rookie to win The Winston.

Earnhardt played a part in recreating one Winston Cup milestone in 2000 when he competed with his father and half-brother Kerry in the Pepsi 400 at Michigan International Speedway. That occasion was only the second time that a father had raced against two sons – Lee Petty and his two sons Richard and Maurice had previously accomplished the feat.

Earnhardt ended the 2000 season with two wins, three Top 5's, five Top 10's, and two poles.

2001

In 2001, the major event of the season occurred on February 18, in the final corner of the final lap of the 2001 Daytona 500. As Earnhardt Jr. and his teammate Michael Waltrip raced to the finish line, he finished second to Waltrip. His father had crashed in turn 4 after Sterling Marlin made contact with his left rear bumper. Earnhardt Sr. shot up the track into the outside wall behind Waltrip and his son and collected Ken Schrader in the process. Earnhardt Sr. was pronounced dead at 5:16 pm due to a basilar skull fracture.

In the aftermath, many disgruntled fans sent death threats to Marlin and his family, blaming him for the crash; Earnhardt Jr. and Waltrip both requested that fans stopped blaming anybody for Earnhardt Sr.'s death and both the local police and NASCAR investigations into the crash cleared Marlin of any involvement. Earnhardt Jr. raced at Rockingham the following weekend, but finished in 43rd-place after a wreck on the first lap that looked eerily similar to his father's wreck just a week earlier.

Returning to Daytona for the Pepsi 400, Earnhardt Jr. made a comeback and had the dominant car of the race, leading 115 out of 160 laps. On the last restart, he managed to make a move from sixth to first place in the span of two laps, with Waltrip holding off the field as Earnhardt Jr. took the checkered flag. He won the MBNA Cal Ripken Jr. 400 at Dover, which was the first Winston Cup Series race following the September 11 attacks as the original scheduled race at New Hampshire Motor Speedway was postponed until the end of the season. After the race, he performed a Polish victory lap while holding a large American flag out the driver's side window.

In October, Earnhardt Jr. took his second restrictor plate win as he won the EA Sports 500 at Talladega, for which he also scored a Winston No Bull 5 $1 million bonus. He was docked 25 points, however, after his car failed post-race inspection. With this win, DEI swept three of the four restrictor plate races for 2001, only failing to win the spring Talladega race. He finished the 2001 season eighth in the points standings with three wins, nine Top 5's, 15 Top 10's, and two poles.

2002–03

In 2002, Earnhardt Jr. had a roller-coaster season. He struggled after enduring a concussion from a head-on collision to the outside wall at the California race in April – an injury he did not admit to until mid-September. In the three races following California, he finished no better than 30th. However, Earnhardt Jr. rallied to sweep both Talladega races (leading a dominating 133 of 188 laps in the spring race), a pair of Bud Pole Awards and an 11th-place finish in the points standings with 11 Top 5's and 16 Top 10's.

In 2003, Earnhardt Jr. became a true title contender, scoring a record-breaking fourth consecutive win at Talladega, after being involved in a 27-car crash on lap 4. He struggled for most of the race, and was at points a half-lap down, only catching back up to the pack through a caution. The win was controversial because with five laps to go, it appeared that Earnhardt went below the yellow line to gain position, but NASCAR ruled that Matt Kenseth had forced him below the line, making it a clean pass.

He later scored a victory at Phoenix in October, recording a career best third-place effort in the point standings, with 13 Top 5's and 21 Top 10's. He also took home the NMPA Most Popular Driver award for the first time in his career.

2004–06

In 2004, Earnhardt won the Daytona 500, six years to the day after his father won his only title in the Great American Race (and 3 years after his father was killed in the 2001 race). Earnhardt came very close to sweeping Speedweeks, as in addition to the Daytona 500, he also won his Gatorade Duel and the Busch Series race. However, he finished 2nd in the Budweiser Shootout to Dale Jarrett.

On July 18, during the summer off-weekend, Earnhardt crashed a Chevrolet Corvette C5-R during a practice for the American Le Mans Series Grand Prix of Sonoma at Infineon Raceway. The car slid off course and hit a concrete barrier during warm-up the day of the race, rupturing a fuel line and causing the car to burst into flames with him still inside. He suffered second and third degree burns on his neck, chin, and legs partially due to not wearing a protective balaclava with his helmet. The burns prevented him from finishing two races where he was relieved by Martin Truex Jr. (at New Hampshire) and his DEI teammate John Andretti (at Pocono) in the middle of the races. In the fall, Earnhardt became the first driver to sweep a weekend at Bristol by winning both the Busch and Nextel Cup races in the same weekend.

Earnhardt was able to qualify for the NASCAR 10-race playoff, and had his 5th NEXTEL Cup win of the season (a career high) at Talladega. However, he was penalized 25 points for use of an obscenity during the television broadcast, in violation of a new NASCAR rule prohibiting participants from using obscene language (the rule had been created the week after the Daytona 500, in the wake of the Super Bowl half-time show controversy). That incident, combined with two consecutive DNF's in the Chase, eventually dropped him out of the running, and he finished fifth in the 2004 NEXTEL Cup Chase despite a career-high 6 wins at Daytona, Atlanta, Richmond, Bristol, Talladega and defending his fall win at Phoenix (though under the non-Chase points system, Earnhardt would have tied his third-place points finish of the previous year). He closed off the 2004 season with 6 wins, sixteen Top 5s, and twenty-one Top 10 finishes. He also picked up his 2nd consecutive Most Popular Driver Award.

At the close of the 2004 season, it was revealed that Tony Eury Sr. would be promoted to the team manager position for the DEI corporation, while Tony Eury Jr. became the crew chief for Michael Waltrip for the 2005 season. Peter Rondeau, a Chance 2 employee who also helped Earnhardt win the Busch Series race at Bristol in August, became the crew chief for Earnhardt in 2005. Rondeau served as Earnhardt's crew chief until the Coca-Cola 600 weekend, when he was replaced with DEI chief engineer Steve Hmiel, who helped Earnhardt score his lone win of 2005 at Chicagoland in July, when he took the lead from Matt Kenseth on the last cycle of pit stops. Earnhardt was eliminated from any possible competition for the NEXTEL Cup championship after suffering an engine failure at the California Speedway. Earnhardt was reunited with his cousin, Tony Eury Jr., after the fall Richmond weekend, and results improved immediately. Earnhardt finished the season 19th in points. For the 3rd straight year, he took home the NMPA Most Popular Driver Award.

Earnhardt's proficiency as a car owner continued. His race team outside of DEI, JR Motorsports, in 2005 fielded a car in the USAR Hooters ProCup Series, winning once and qualifying for the Four Champions playoff. Mark McFarland moved to the Busch Series in 2006, driving the No. 88 JR Motorsports US Navy Chevrolet, with Richard Childress Racing providing assistance; however, he was fired before the fall Michigan race, the Carfax 250. He was replaced by Robby Gordon and Martin Truex Jr. for the rest of the year. Long-time short track racer Shane Huffman drove Earnhardt's USAR Hooters ProCup car in 2006. In 2006, during the spring weekend at Talladega Superspeedway, Earnhardt and other DEI drivers drove with special black paint schemes on their cars, reminiscent of his late father's famous No. 3 paint scheme. On Father's Day in 2006, he drove a vintage Budweiser car at Michigan International Speedway to honor both his grandfather (Ralph Earnhardt) and his father, who at one point in both their careers used the No. 8 car. After rain caused the race to be ended early, Earnhardt finished 3rd with Kasey Kahne winning the race. After 17 races in the 2006 season, Earnhardt sat 3rd in the championship standings with 1 win, coming at Richmond in May 2006.

During the race at New Hampshire, he experienced the second engine failure of his 2006 season, ultimately leading to a 43rd-place finish. Following New Hampshire was the race at Pocono, where he was running in the middle of the pack when he crashed in turn 2. These two events catapulted him to 11th in the points standing, out of the Chase for the Cup. At Indianapolis Motor Speedway, Earnhardt and his crew made a critical decision to stay out on the final pit stop to get a much needed Top 10 finish to move him up to 10th in the points. He made the 2006 Chase for the NEXTEL Cup after finishing 17th in the Chevy Rock and Roll 400 at Richmond International Raceway on September 9, 2006. He came close to winning at Talladega, and was leading on the last lap when Brian Vickers made contact with Earnhardt's future teammate Jimmie Johnson, sending Johnson into Earnhardt and spinning both of them out. His points position going into the Chase was 6th. He finished the season 5th in the point standings, 147 points behind leader Jimmie Johnson.

2007: Final Season At DEI

Earnhardt began the 2007 NASCAR Nextel Cup Series season by finishing 32nd at the Daytona 500 as the result of a late race crash. His first Top 10 came at Bristol Motor Speedway in the Food City 500, where he finished 7th. His first Top 5 came at Martinsville Speedway in the Goody's Cool Orange 500. He led 136 laps and finished 5th. He collected his third Top 10 of the season and his 8th at Talladega Superspeedway with his 7th-place performance in the 2007 Aaron's 499. On May 14, 2007, he was docked 100 driver championship points, car owner Teresa Earnhardt was docked 100 owner points, and his crew chief, Tony Eury Jr., was fined $100,000 and suspended for 6 races due to the use of illegal mounting brackets used to attach the wing to his car. During the April race at Texas Motor Speedway he drove the last 10 laps in the No. 5 car of Kyle Busch owned by Rick Hendrick.

On May 27, 2007, Earnhardt rode a camouflage No. 8 car in the Coca-Cola 600 on Memorial Day to raise money for the families of military troops. Jeff Gordon, Jimmie Johnson, Greg Biffle, Mark Martin, Ward Burton, Denny Hamlin, Casey Mears, Shane Huffman and Bill Elliott also changed their paint schemes for the occasion. He finished eighth, after leading with seven laps to go, but he had to pit for fuel and Casey Mears finished with the win.

On August 5, 2007, Earnhardt earned his first pole position in a race since 2002 at Pocono Raceway. Although Kurt Busch won the race, Earnhardt had a dramatic comeback to finish 2nd after spinning out and experiencing shock troubles. Earnhardt led for eight laps before Busch took over. On August 12 at Watkins Glen International, Earnhardt was making the push into the Top 12 of the Nextel Cup standings from his No. 13 position. After being at the No. 2 position during the race, Earnhardt had engine problems on lap 64 and had to end his race day. After the Glen, he tried furiously to reach the 12th spot in standings. However, a resurgence by Kurt Busch and a blown engine during the final race at Richmond ended his Chase hopes. That was his last chance to participate for the Championship at Dale Earnhardt, Inc. (DEI). After the 2007 season, Dale Jr. won the NMPA Chex Most Popular Driver award for the 5th consecutive time.

After the season, Earnhardt, who had always been fascinated with Australian V8 Supercars, test drove the cars on vacation in Australia.

Move to Hendrick Motorsports
After much speculation, Earnhardt announced on May 10, 2007, that he would leave Dale Earnhardt Inc., the company founded by his father, to drive for another team in 2008. Earnhardt expressed that his decision was based entirely on his desires to achieve his career goal of a Sprint Cup Championship, and his apparent belief that he would not be able to attain that objective while driving for DEI. He said that unless he could gain majority ownership, and therefore control, of DEI, that he was not confident in the organization's ability to field the elite level equipment that would yield the elusive title.

On June 13, 2007, he announced at a press conference that he had signed a five-year contract with Hendrick Motorsports, replacing Kyle Busch. At the time, Hendrick consisted of Jeff Gordon, Jimmie Johnson, and Casey Mears.
One month later on July 13, 2007, it was announced that his long-time primary sponsor Budweiser would not be with Earnhardt when he made the move to Hendrick. Other contractual agreements in place at Hendrick Motorsports are said to have prevented a relationship with Bud. Due to a previous friendship between team owner Rick Hendrick and Earnhardt's father, Earnhardt later said that going to drive for Hendrick almost felt like driving for a second family team.

On August 15, 2007, it was announced that Earnhardt would not be taking his familiar No. 8 with him to Hendrick Motorsports in 2008. His late grandfather, Ralph Earnhardt, used that number, while Earnhardt picked it when he entered the Cup Series in 1999. His father also used No. 8 early in his career. Earnhardt Jr. blamed his stepmother for not allowing the No. 8 to move with him to Hendrick Motorsports. Earnhardt said negotiations broke down when Teresa Earnhardt asked for part of the licensing revenue, along with wanting the number back after he retired. (The No. 8 team, after a successful season in 2008 with co-drivers Mark Martin and Aric Almirola, would end up being shut down in 2009 after DEI's merger with Ganassi Racing.)

Earnhardt moved to the No. 88 car with Tony Eury Jr. coming to Hendrick to remain as his crew chief. On September 19, 2007, the official announcement was made that Earnhardt would be driving the No. 88 Mountain Dew AMP/National Guard Chevrolet Impala for the 2008 season.

The No. 88, according to NASCAR archives, was driven by Ralph Earnhardt, his paternal grandfather, in 1957. His maternal grandfather, Robert Gee, was one of the first employees of All Star Racing, initially a Late Model Sportsman (now Xfinity Series) team with Gee as Hendrick's partner, which is now Hendrick Motorsports. Hendrick said about Earnhardt and his uncles, "I can look at Robert Gee Jr., or Jimmy Gee, or Dale Jr. and all I see is Robert Gee. They're the spitting image of him. I go back and look and pictures from when we did things together, and I have to say, I owe Robert a lot." Starting in the 2008 season, Hendrick Motorsports merged its Nationwide Series team to Earnhardt's JR Motorsports, with the cars coming from Earnhardt's shop, which employs his mother and uncles.

2008

Earnhardt started the 2008 season by winning the Budweiser Shootout, a non-points paying exhibition. It was his first race for Hendrick. He led for a total of 47 out of 70 laps, a Budweiser Shootout record. He followed that up five days later with a win in the first of the Gatorade Duels. This was his third career win in the duels, however he was unable to follow it up with victory in the Daytona 500, finishing 9th. Ryan Newman was the winner of the event.

Earnhardt was docked 50 points because his rear spoiler did not meet the specified height in the Nationwide Series. His crew chief Chad Walter was fined $35,000, suspended for 6 races and was placed on probation until December 31, 2008. Team owner Rick Hendrick was also docked 50 owner points along with Earnhardt.

At Michigan, Earnhardt broke his 76-race winless streak, managing to stretch his fuel mileage enough to allow him to win under a caution on the last lap of a green-white-checkered (overtime) finish. He did not find much success after the Michigan win. He then went back to Talladega Superspeedway for the AMP Energy 500 where he was en route to a possible win before being caught up in "The Big One" late in the race. He headed to Martinsville Speedway where he finished 2nd to teammate Jimmie Johnson. He ended the season in the garage area at Homestead Miami Speedway in The Ford 400 after losing his brakes with just a few laps to go in the race. Earnhardt finished the season 12th in points, 557 points behind champion Jimmie Johnson.

2009
In the season-opening Daytona 500, Earnhardt began well, even leading for a lap. However multiple misfortunes, including a missed pit stop and a 1-lap penalty for pitting outside of his pit box, sent him far into the back of the running order. Earnhardt was then directly involved in a controversial crash on lap 124, when, while fighting to return to the lead lap, he came in contact with Brian Vickers while fighting to be the first driver one lap down (who gets a free pass should the caution flag come out), causing a 10-car pileup which included Denny Hamlin, Scott Speed, Jimmie Johnson, Kyle and Kurt Busch, Robby Gordon, Jamie McMurray, and Carl Edwards. Vickers and Kyle Busch later criticized Earnhardt, who denied purposely clipping Vickers. Earnhardt criticized Vickers for blocking him on the inside. The race concluded early due to the rain and Earnhardt officially finished 27th. He later apologized for his actions but maintained that he never intended to wreck Vickers.

After a blown engine at California and falling to 35th in owners' points, he finished 10th at Las Vegas and reached 29th place in points. He finished 8th at Martinsville. He had a string of poor finishes including 20th at Texas, and 31st at Phoenix after being spun out by Casey Mears. He gained confidence in his team with a very strong performance at Talladega, leading for 20 laps, and finishing second to his protege Brad Keselowski after Keselowski sent Edwards flying into the catch fence. However, two weeks later at Richmond, Earnhardt finished 27th. He was again spun out late in the race at Darlington and ended the race in 27th place. He then finished 10th in the All-Star race at Lowe's Motor Speedway.

Earnhardt's poor performance continued as he finished 40th at the Coca-Cola 600 due to an ill-handling race car, after which Tony Eury Jr. was fired as his crew chief on May 28, 2009. Lance McGrew was named interim crew chief starting with the June 2009 race at Pocono, with team manager Brian Whitesell calling the shots at Dover the previous week. Earnhardt finished 12th at Dover for the Autism Speaks 400 with McGrew as his crew chief after contending for the lead. At Pocono Raceway, however, he again ended with a 27th-place finish. Earnhardt improved thereafter following the change, finishing fifteenth at Chicagoland Speedway, though he had one DNF at Daytona International Speedway after being taken out of the race early in a large pileup.

At the Carfax 400 at Michigan, Earnhardt charged to the front near the end of the race and finished 3rd; he also earned his second Top 5 finish this season in the same race. Earnhardt finished 9th in the Sharpie 500 a week later at Bristol, but his bad luck continued at the Auto Club Speedway when he was involved in a multi-car incident. After a 39th qualifying run at Lowe's Motor Speedway, he said "I'm about to the end of my rope". At the fall Talladega race, Earnhardt had a solid run, including leading several laps, before finishing in 11th place. Lance McGrew had the "interim" taken off of his title, and he continued working with the No. 88 team through the end of the 2010 season. Earnhardt ended 2009 winless scoring two top-fives, five top-tens, an average finish of 23.3, and finished a career low 25th in the standings.

2010

On February 6, 2010, Earnhardt qualified second overall for the 52nd Daytona 500 after losing the pole position to teammate Mark Martin. He started 1st in the Gatorade Duel No. 2 on February 11 of that year. He finished 11th in the 2010 Budweiser Shootout after struggling with an ill-handling car for most of the race.

On February 13, 2010, while running in the front of the pack at the Daytona Nationwide Series race, Earnhardt was caught up in a multi-car wreck, causing his car to flip upside down on the backstretch. He walked away from the wreck uninjured. His driver Danica Patrick was caught up in another wreck before Earnhardt flipped. The next day during the 2010 Daytona 500 Jr. made a late charge to the front of the pack coming from 6th to 2nd in one turn but his run was foiled by Jamie McMurray as Earnhardt Jr, finished 2nd. It was his best run all year. His only other Top 5s came at the July Daytona race and Loudon in September. He finished the year with eight top 10s and 1 pole as inconsistency plagued the team.

On July 2, 2010, Earnhardt raced the No. 3 blue and yellow Wrangler Chevrolet (painted to pay tribute to his father and fans) and drove it to victory lane in the Nationwide Series Subway Jalepeño 250 at Daytona. He finished the 2010 Season on November 21, 2010, ranking 21st. Hendrick Motorsports then did a major crew chief shuffle, pairing Earnhardt's crew chief McGrew with Mark Martin, while Gordon's crew chief Steve Letarte moved to the 88 team, and Gordon got Martin's crew chief, Alan Gustafson. On December 2, 2010, it was announced that Earnhardt won the NMPA Most Popular Driver award for the 8th consecutive time.

2011

He began the season by drawing the pole position at the 2011 Budweiser Shootout, where he finished 19th in the race. On February 13, he earned his first pole position at Daytona International Speedway, as well as his first at a track that uses restrictor plates. Due to a practice crash, he had to start at the back of the field for both the duel race and the 500. He finished 24th in the Daytona 500 after being wrecked with 4 laps to go. Over the next seven races, Earnhardt would achieve five Top 10 finishes, including a 2nd-place finish at Martinsville after losing the lead to Kevin Harvick with 4 laps to go, and a 4th-place finish at Talladega in a photo finish with Jimmie Johnson, Jeff Gordon, Mark Martin, Clint Bowyer, and Kevin Harvick. Earnhardt came within half a lap of snapping his then-104 race winless streak at the Coca-Cola 600 at the Charlotte Motor Speedway, when he ran out of fuel during a green-white-checkered finish, finishing 7th. The following week at Kansas, Earnhardt finished 2nd to Brad Keselowski. He followed this up with a solid 6th-place finish at Pocono. Over the course of the next three races, Earnhardt would slide to 7th in the Championship points, finishing 21st at Michigan, 41st at Infineon, and 19th at Daytona. On September 1, 2011, Earnhardt announced he had signed a 5-year contract extension with Hendrick Motorsports to drive the No. 88 until 2017. On September 19, 2011, Earnhardt made his first Chase for the Sprint Cup appearance since 2008 at Chicagoland. At the season finale at Homestead, he finished 11th and finished 7th in the final points standings. On December 1, 2011, it was announced that Earnhardt won the Most Popular Driver award for the 9th consecutive time.

2012
Earnhardt started 8th in the Budweiser Shootout, led for several laps, and finished 20th after being caught up in a six-car crash on lap 55 that also involved Matt Kenseth, Joey Logano and Kevin Harvick. In the Gatorade Duel, Earnhardt performed strong, starting on the outside pole in the first duel race. He led a few laps in the early part of the race before finishing second to Tony Stewart after his Nationwide Series teammate Danica Patrick smashed hard into the inside wall in a last lap crash on the back straightaway. In the postponed Daytona 500, he finished in 2nd place behind Matt Kenseth, after passing Greg Biffle on the last lap. At Phoenix, Earnhardt's car struggled most of the race and came out with a 14th-place finish.

At Las Vegas, Earnhardt led 70 laps early but finished 10th based on bad pit strategy. At Bristol, Earnhardt finished 15th following a late race contact with teammate Jeff Gordon, and a speeding penalty. Earnhardt would back this up with a pair of back to back 3rd-place finishes at Auto Club and Martinsville Speedway, leaving him second in the standings.

In the following weeks, Earnhardt would bring a string of Top 10s: 10th at Texas, 7th at Kansas, 2nd at Richmond, and 9th at Talladega, where he led 10 laps. The following week, Earnhardt struggled for most of the race at Darlington, and had to settle with a 17th-place finish. At the All-Star Race, Earnhardt won the Sprint Showdown, leading all 40 laps to race his way into the big event. In the event, Earnhardt won the 4th segment and in the final 10 lap shootout, had to settle for a 5th-place finish. The following two weeks, Earnhardt would post of finishes of 6th at Charlotte and 4th at Dover heading into the summer months. At the newly repaved Pocono Raceway, Earnhardt led 36 laps during the race, but made a late race fuel pit stop from 3rd place with just over 20 laps to go, finishing 8th and standing 2nd in points. At the 2012 Quicken Loans 400 at Michigan, Earnhardt dominated the race, leading 95 laps, and won, snapping a 143-race winless streak, almost four years to the day after his last win on June 15, 2008. Earnhardt would suffer a 23rd-place finish at Sonoma after being wrecked in a green-white-checkered finish, but was still able to cross the finish line intact and on the lead lap, continuing his streak of being the only driver to finish all races on the lead lap. He would back this up with a fourth-place finish in the Quaker State 400 at Kentucky Speedway.

The following week at Daytona, a last lap crash resulted in a 15th-place finish for Earnhardt but still kept his streak of being the only driver to finish every single lap in every race. Earnhardt backed up with a couple of Top 5 finishes, finishing 4th at both Loudon and Indianapolis, where he gained the points lead for the first time since 2004, after points leader Matt Kenseth was taken out in a late race crash.  Back at Pocono, Earnhardt was running in the 2nd position, but a break in the transmission sent the 88 to the garage, but he came back out 18 laps down and finished 32nd, due to rain that came and ended the race and a late race wreck involving Jimmie Johnson, Matt Kenseth, and Denny Hamlin. His streak of completing on the lead lap came to an end, but he still maintained the points lead with 5 races until the chase cutoff. At Watkins Glen, Earnhardt had a steady Top 10 going in the final laps but a late race spin resulted in a 28th-place finish, this would drop the 88 team from 1st to 4th in the points.

Returning to Michigan for the Pure Michigan 400, Earnhardt had to start in 42nd place after a crash in practice forced him to move to a backup car. He led for a number of laps mid-race and finished on the lead lap in 4th place. Earnhardt, Ryan Newman and Kasey Kahne also escaped engine difficulties that plagued Jimmie Johnson, Jeff Gordon, and Tony Stewart. At Bristol Motor Speedway, Earnhardt started 16th after a qualifying rainout; he led 13 laps in the race before pit road penalties resulted in a 12th-place finish. The finish locked him into the 2012 Chase for the Sprint Cup, alongside Greg Biffle, and teammate Jimmie Johnson. At Atlanta Motor Speedway, Earnhardt went a lap down early but recovered to earn a 7th-place finish. The following week at Richmond International Raceway, Earnhardt earned his first pole of the season. He would go on to lead 69 laps, but a late race pit stop resulted in the 88 team getting a 14th-place finish, and being seeded 7th in the standings. In the first race of the chase at Chicagoland Speedway, Earnhardt finished 8th despite having to start at the rear of the field due to an engine change. Finishes of 13th and 11th at Loudon and Dover left the 88 team 7th in the standings.

Concussion
On the morning of October 11, 2012, Hendrick Motorsports announced that Earnhardt would have to sit out the Bank of America 500 at Charlotte and the Hollywood Casino 400 at Kansas due to a concussion from a 25-car crash on the last lap at Talladega on October 7, 2012. That weekend, Earnhardt finished 20th at Talladega when he took a hard lick in a crash after making contact with Bobby Labonte. Prior to this, Earnhardt had suffered a concussion during an August 29 test at Kansas Speedway. Regan Smith was announced to replace him at those two races. Prior to the concussion, Earnhardt had competed in 461 consecutive races, dating back to the 1999 Atlanta event. The 2012 Bank of America 500 marked the first race since the 1979 Southern 500 that an Earnhardt had not competed in the Sprint Cup Series as Dale Earnhardt had competed in every race from that one up until his death in the 2001 Daytona 500. On October 23, 2012, Earnhardt was cleared for the Tums Fast Relief 500 at Martinsville after missing two races. He started strong in the race, but a late race spin with Carl Edwards placed for a 21st-place finish. His first top ten finish after returning to the track was a seventh-place finish at Texas. At Phoenix, Earnhardt fought an ill-handling car, and finished 21st. At the season finale, at Homestead-Miami Speedway, Earnhardt would finish 10th. This was his first top 10 finish at the 1.5-mile track, and his 20th of the season. He closed the season 12th in the final standings. On November 29, 2012, it was announced that Earnhardt won the NMPA Most Popular Driver Award for the 10th consecutive year. This tied Bill Elliott's streak of 10 consecutive wins in the award.

2013

Earnhardt started the 2013 season with an 8th-place finish in the rechristened Sprint Unlimited. He qualified 11th for the Budweiser Duel, but he blew an engine in practice, he was forced to drop to the rear of the field. After narrowly missing a 3-car wreck between Carl Edwards, Trevor Bayne, and Regan Smith, he finished 9th. He finished fourth at the DRIVE4COPD 300 after submarining under Alex Bowman's car in a violent last lap wreck.

In the Sprint Cup Series, Earnhardt hit a slight resurgence, and in the first five races of the season recorded three Top 5s and five Top 10 finishes. It began with a second-place finish to teammate Jimmie Johnson at the Daytona 500, Earnhardt's third runner up finish in the 500 since 2010. The following week at Phoenix, he led for 47 laps, but was shuffled back in traffic during a cycle caution flag pit stops, which allowed Carl Edwards to assume the lead while Junior finished in fifth place. This was followed by two more Top 10 finishes: 7th at Las Vegas and 6th at Bristol. At Fontana, Earnhardt started mid-pack and after a couple of mistakes including a lengthy pit stop caused by missed lug nuts on a right rear tire, he came home in 2nd-place finish, assuming the points lead as a result of Brad Keselowski going off pace and falling back. Two weeks later in Martinsville, Earnhardt struggled throughout the race, and spun out after Danica Patrick was hit by Brian Vickers and sent into Earnhardt and ended up finishing 24th, 2 laps down, losing the points lead to Jimmie Johnson.

At Texas, Earnhardt ran near the front until lap 187, when his battery alternator quit and he ended up finishing 29th. At Kansas, he ran near the front until a debris caution happened while he, Ricky Stenhouse Jr., and Carl Edwards were all on pit road. Earnhardt would go a lap down, take the wave-around, and finish 16th. At Richmond, he finished 10th. At Talladega, he went a lap down early after some banging with Travis Kvapil. However, with a caution for a crash on lap 43, Earnhardt got the free pass to get back on the lead lap. He made his way back up through the field to the Top 5, but slipped back to 17th at the end.

The following week at Darlington, Earnhardt raced inside the Top 10 much of the night before settling for a 9th-place finish. He was one of only a few cars who were able to avoid being put a lap down by Kyle Busch.

The following week in the Sprint All-Star Race, Earnhardt battled a tight handling car much of that night before finishing 7th. The following week for the Coca-Cola 600, Earnhardt lost an engine and finished 39th, giving him his first DNF since 2011. The next two weeks saw a rebound, with finishes of 10th at Dover and 3rd at Pocono. At the Quicken Loans 400, Earnhardt led 23 laps but suffered an engine failure, and finished 37th in what was the lowest point of the season for the Hendrick Motorsports teams as a whole (Kasey Kahne and Jeff Gordon both had DNFs due to crashes, and Jimmie Johnson cut a tire with 5 laps to go). After the low of Michigan, Earnhardt had a 12th-place finish at Sonoma.

Though he started on the pole, he lost the lead to Carl Edwards early. However, while Earnhardt was leading after the restart from a competition caution (due to a rain delay), Denny Hamlin cut a tire and the carcass came up the track and was struck by Earnhardt's splitter and also by Jimmie Johnson's car, causing significant damage. Earnhardt had to make several charges through the field to salvage a 12th-place finish. He then took an 8th-place finish at the Coke Zero 400. He, Johnson, and Ryan Newman were the only three drivers to sweep the Top 10 in both Daytona races.

Earnhardt then battled a struggling car at New Hampshire, where he finished 14th. After the final off week, he found some consistency with finishes of 6th at Indianapolis and 5th at Pocono, while battling loose wheels and vibrations in a span of two weeks.

The No. 88 team then had two bad weeks, with a 30th-place finish at Watkins Glen due to a late race crash with Kasey Kahne. The next week, Earnhardt blew a right front tire while running in the Top 10. The damage was enough that he finished 26 laps down, in 36th place. This evaporated his Chase cushion, but with finishes of 10th at Bristol and 8th at Atlanta, he was able to rebuild this cushion. At Richmond, the last race of the regular season, Earnhardt only needed to finish 32nd or better to make the Chase. A 13th-place finish did this, and he entered the Chase seeded in ninth place. This was the first time in Earnhardt's career that he had made three straight Chase appearances. In the first Chase race at Chicagoland Speedway, Earnhardt suffered an engine failure, placing him last in Chase competition. He bounced back at New Hampshire Motor Speedway, leading 17 laps and finishing 6th. The result was good enough to move Earnhardt up to 11th in Chase for the Sprint Cup standings with eight races left in the season.

At Dover, Earnhardt won his second pole of the season, setting a new qualifying speed record of 161.849 mph. This was the first time since 2002 that he had recorded more than one pole during a season. During the race, Earnhardt would lead 80 laps, but would finish 2nd to Jimmie Johnson. The following week at Kansas, he finished 8th. Making his 500th Cup start at Charlotte, Earnhardt led 19 laps early, but finished 15th while battling a tight race car. The following week at Talladega, Earnhardt led 38 laps and was about to receive a push from Austin Dillon to overtake Jamie McMurray on the last lap when Ricky Stenhouse Jr. tapped Dillon, causing that driver to spin out and then get hit by Casey Mears, leaving Earnhardt with a 2nd-place finish. The following week at Martinville, Earnhardt earned an 8th-place finish. The next week at Texas, he had a solid night, finishing 2nd to Johnson for the third time in the season (after Daytona and Dover). The next week at Phoenix, Earnhardt started by being forced to pit with a loose wheel early, putting him a lap down. However, a caution allowed him to use the free pass to get back on the lead lap and salvage a 4th-place finish.

At the season finale, the last 67 laps saw a tight battle for the lead between Earnhardt; Matt Kenseth; and Denny Hamlin. Hamlin won while Earnhardt finished 3rd, giving him his first Top 5 at Homestead. He finished off the season 5th in the points, with two pole positions, ten Top 5s, and a career-high 22 Top 10 finishes.

On December 5, 2013, Earnhardt won the Most Popular Driver Award for the 11th consecutive  year, breaking Bill Elliott's record, who scored 10 straight awards from 1991 to 2000.

2014

The No. 88 team made headlines even before the start of the season. During the regular Daytona Winter test in January, it was announced that crew chief Steve Letarte would step down from the pit box after the season to become a full-time member of the upcoming NASCAR on NBC broadcast team, alongside Jeff Burton and Rick Allen. Earnhardt and Letarte reassured that this move would not interfere with them winning races and competing for the championship at the season's end. In the Sprint Unlimited, Earnhardt led for 7 laps, but in the last segment, contact with Marcos Ambrose caused him to hit the wall in turn 1, finishing 9th. In the first Budweiser Duel, Earnhardt started 4th, and led 14 laps, before fading back to finish where he started.

In the Daytona 500, Earnhardt started 9th. His car hung around mid-pack for most of the first quarter of the race. After a six-hour and 22-minute red flag, Earnhardt's car came alive, taking the lead with 70 laps remaining. He led 54 of the last 70 laps and he held off Denny Hamlin and Brad Keselowski to win his second Daytona 500, just 10 years after his first one. The following week at Phoenix, Earnhardt continued his momentum, finishing 2nd to Kevin Harvick. At Las Vegas, Earnhardt gambled on fuel in the remaining 40 laps, but he ran out of gas while leading on the last lap, finishing 2nd to eventual race winner Brad Keselowski. At Bristol, he was strong early, and had a chance to become the first driver since Richard Petty to start a season with four straight Top 2 finishes, until tire problems forced him to make an unscheduled stop, leaving him to finish 24th, four laps down.

At Auto Club Speedway, Earnhardt started 15th. However, on lap 44, his car lost a right front tire and hit the outside wall in turn 2, bringing out a caution, making him one of several victims of tire failures that plagued the race. After being repaired and falling to the back of the lead lap, Earnhardt made several charges through the field to salvage a 12th-place finish, keeping him at 2nd place in the points. The following week at Martinsville, Earnhardt battled inside the Top 5 all day, leading 25 laps, and finished 3rd, giving him his 4th Top 3 finish of the season, and regained the points lead. At Texas, he crashed on Lap 13 and caught on fire. He finished last and fell 5 positions in points and dropped to 31 points behind new points leader Jeff Gordon. The following week at Darlington, Earnhardt raced among the Top 5 all night, and was leading on a green-white-checkered finish, before finishing 2nd to Kevin Harvick.

At Richmond, after the Easter off week, Earnhardt was strong in the race, racing among the Top 3 late, and led 7 laps, but a green-white-checkered, and bad brakes forced Earnhardt to a 7th-place finish. The following week at Talladega, Earnhardt raced among the pack until the middle of the race, when he took the lead. He led for 26 laps, but the last 30 laps saw the car take a conservative pace, and was never able to regain any track position, and finished 26th. At Kansas, for the first night race at the track, Earnhardt ran solidly in the Top 5, even leading a few laps, before finishing 5th.

For the Sprint All-Star Race, Earnhardt started 6th, but battled a tight car all night, and was never a real contender. Earnhardt crossed the finish line 4th. The following week at the Coca-Cola 600, he raced inside the Top 5 for most of the night, before making an unscheduled pit stop for an engine vibration. This resulted in a 19th-place finish, only two laps down. The following week at Dover, Earnhardt raced inside the Top 10 all day, and was running in the Top 5 late, but a mistake on pit road left them with a 9th-place finish.

At Pocono, Earnhardt started eighth and stayed inside the Top 10 most of the afternoon. On the last restart, he was behind Brad Keselowski. In a reversal of the events at Las Vegas, with 5 laps to go, Keselowski tried to move behind the lap down car of Danica Patrick to get a piece of trash off his grille, which caused Earnhardt to slip by and never look back en route to his first victory at Pocono and second of the season. The win marked the first time since 2004 that he had won multiple races in a season. The next week at Michigan, Earnhardt started inside the Top 5, but finished 7th, after several cars had different pit strategies. The next week at Sonoma, saw Earnhardt have his statistical best road course finish, staying in the top ten for most of the race, and finished 3rd. The following week at Kentucky, Earnhardt finished 5th.

Returning to Daytona, Earnhardt was involved in an early 16-car pileup on the front straightaway on lap 20, but was able to salvage a 14th-place finish by the time the race was called for rain after 112 of 160 laps.

Earnhardt was able to bounce back the following week at New Hampshire with a 10th-place finish. With the finish, he clinched a Chase berth, with him being enough inside the Top 30 and having two victories. The following week, he finished 9th at Indianapolis.

The questions referring to the replacement of Steve Letarte were finally answered on July 30, for it was announced that Greg Ives, Chase Elliott's Nationwide Series crew chief at JR Motorsports, would return to Hendrick Motorsports, and take over Earnhardt's pit box for 2015.

Returning to Pocono, Earnhardt started 9th. He ran inside the Top 10 for most of the race, and took the lead from Greg Biffle with 14 laps to go. Earnhardt had built up a lead in excess of three seconds when the caution came out for Kurt Busch's cut tire on lap 154, erasing his lead. He then sweated out a four lap shootout on the last restart to take his 3rd win of the year, marking the first time since 2006 that a driver swept both Pocono races (Denny Hamlin was the last driver). This win tied Earnhardt with Jimmie Johnson and Brad Keselowski for most wins of the season up to that point.

At Watkins Glen, Earnhardt finished 11th, and due to Jeff Gordon struggling, assumed the points lead, for the first time since Martinsville in April. The following week at Michigan, he made contact with Kyle Larson on pit road, but through hard work from his pit crew, was able to lead four laps and salvage a 5th-place finish.

The following week at Bristol, while running 5th, leader Denny Hamlin was wrecked by Kevin Harvick while racing for the lead, which then sent Hamlin's car into the inside wall. Hamlin's car then slid right back up in front of the No. 88 and slammed into the left-side door of the car, and the contact was bad enough to send Earnhardt behind the wall, and suffer a 39th-place finish. This was his second DNF of the year, after the early exit in the spring Texas race.

In the final race of NASCAR's regular season at Richmond, Earnhardt made his debut with a Nationwide-sponsored No. 88. He raced to a 12th-place finish, after what was a long, difficult night for the team. Despite struggling at the 3/4-mile track, Earnhardt seeded third in the Chase grid, behind series leader Brad Keselowski, and tied with Jeff Gordon, Jimmie Johnson, and Joey Logano for 2nd place. He started the Challenger Round of the Chase with an 11th-place finish in Chicago. The following week at New Hampshire, Earnhardt finished a solid 9th-place finish, giving him a comfortable advantage to make the Contender Round after Dover. At Dover, he finished 17th to make it to the next round.

At Kansas, after a 5th-place run in the spring, Earnhardt was looking to repeat this feat to start off the contender with a solid finish to help his chances to extend his run for the championship. After leading 45 laps in the same car he used to win both Pocono races earlier in the season, a cut right front tire resulted in a 39th-place finish. That finish caused him to fall to 11th place in points, 25 points behind 8th place. He came to Charlotte needing a win or a good finish. He led early but around lap 133, his shifter broke due to a vibration (a similar problem had befallen Jimmie Johnson at Michigan in August). He had to make multiple pit stops to fix the problem and never recovered, ending up 20th. He fell to last in the Chase standings, 26 points behind 8th.

At Talladega, Earnhardt started 28th and led for 31 laps. However, a crash on the back straightaway when he was turned by Greg Biffle ended his title contention chances and left him with a 31st-place finish.

Despite being knocked out of the Chase, Earnhardt continued to be consistent. At Martinsville, he led 79 laps and was leading with ten laps to go when a caution came out for a wreck between Kyle Larson and Marcos Ambrose. On the resulting restart, Earnhardt was running 5th. During the restart, he slipped through the pack and overtook Tony Stewart for the lead in turn 4. He continued to hold the lead to win the race ahead of Jeff Gordon. It was Earnhardt's first career win at Martinsville.

Returning to Texas, Earnhardt had a rather average run, starting 12th and finishing 6th. At Phoenix, he had a solid day and got another Top 10, finishing 8th. At Homestead, Earnhardt had a tire problem early. He got the free pass and managed to crack the Top 5 at one point but fell back late to finish 14th. He finished 8th in the final standings with what was the best season for Earnhardt since 2004 with 4 wins, 12 Top 5s, 20 Top 10s, and an average finish of 12.2. For the 12th straight year, Earnhardt won the NMPA Most Popular Driver Award.

2015

At the end of the 2014, Earnhardt Jr.'s crew chief Steve Letarte departed Hendrick Motorsports to join NASCAR on NBC's broadcasting team. Letarte was replaced by Chase Elliott's 2014 Xfinity crew chief Greg Ives. Due to National Guard dropping their motorsports sponsorships, Earnhardt Jr. also got a new sponsor in the form of Nationwide Insurance.

Earnhardt Jr. kicked off 2015 with a ninth-place finish in the Sprint Unlimited. On February 19, he won the first Budweiser Duel in what was his fourth triumph in the Budweiser Duels. In the Daytona 500, he led for over 30 laps but on one of the last restarts, he made a move that mired him in the middle without help, and fell back to 16th with 15 laps to go, but managed to make his way back to third place by the last lap. This was his fifth Top 3 finish in the Daytona 500 in six years, after his runner-up finishes in 2010, 2012, and 2013, and his win in 2014.

At Atlanta, Earnhardt Jr. came home with another third-place finish and at Las Vegas, he finished fourth, scoring his third Top 5 finish after taking two tires during green flag pit-stops with 30 laps to go. At Phoenix, he had his worst finish of the year, with a last place finish after a tire-blowout. At Auto Club, he finished 6th. At Martinsville, he also ran inside the Top 20 until a tire-blowout made him get involved in a massive pileup that destroyed the front end of his car. Because of this crash, he would go on to finish 36th. At Texas, he narrowly was beaten by Kevin Harvick for second place. At Bristol, he ran as high as third until a loose wheel put him down two laps down. Although he never got them back, he was able to bring home a 16th-place finish only two laps down. At Richmond, he ran in the Top 10 all day until he and Tony Stewart made contact but managed to finish 14th.

At Talladega, Earnhardt Jr. started in row 2. He stayed near the front of the pack for most of the day, taking the lead with 27 laps to go and sailing away to his sixth win at the track and his first since October 2004, tying him with teammate Jeff Gordon for most wins among active drivers at Talladega. At Kansas, he finished third after staying out on the last caution. At Charlotte, he gambled on fuel and barely beat out Matt Kenseth and Martin Truex Jr. for another third-place finish. Earnhardt led three laps at Dover but a penalty for speeding on pit road cost him, although he was able to finish 14th two laps down.

At Pocono, Earnhardt ran in the top ten all day. On a late restart, he and Brad Keselowski cut their tires from incidental contact and a caution flew seconds later when Keselowski hit the wall after making contact with Brett Moffitt. Earnhardt Jr. pitted and restarted 29th with 20 laps to go and salvaged an 11th-place finish. Earnhardt finished second in the rain-shortened Michigan race after he could not pass Kurt Busch on the last restart before the race was called for rain on lap 138. Earnhardt also had another solid Top 10 run at Sonoma, finishing 7th.

Returning to Daytona, Earnhardt Jr. won the pole for the Coke Zero 400 after qualifying was rained out and the starting lineup was set by opening practice times. In the race itself, after enduring a rain delay, he took the lead early on lap 8, and after leading 97 laps, held off multiple charges from Jimmie Johnson and Denny Hamlin in the closing laps to take his second win of the year. The win itself, however, was overshadowed by the last lap crash that saw Austin Dillon's car fly into the catch fence. Earnhardt Jr. also became only the 23rd driver in NASCAR Sprint Cup history to lead over 8,000 laps. He achieved this milestone, when he led 97 laps. This brought his career total laps led count to 8,051.

At Kentucky, Earnhardt Jr. struggled with overheated brakes, and even caused a caution when he brushed the outside wall in turns 3 and 4 halfway through the race. Later, on lap 206, he would be the subject of controversy when he rear-ended Danica Patrick and spun her out, in part because of his faulty brakes. Patrick retaliated by cursing at Earnhardt on the radio and ramming him on pit road. Earnhardt was perplexed with Patrick's reaction, saying  "I mean, what am I supposed to say other than the truth? We didn't have any brakes going into the corner. I know better than to run into her because it gets so much attention. There wasn't nothing I could do. I mean, as hard as I hit her, what the hell did she think I was doing? Trying to wreck her? We ain't got no problem. It's not like we were having a problem out on the racetrack with her. It's not like I just drew her name out of a hat and decided she was the one I was going to run into tonight."

At New Hampshire, Earnhardt Jr. started 19th and finished 5th.

At Indianapolis, Earnhardt Jr. was running well until lap 147, when he got forced into the grass in turn 1 and spun out. He was able to salvage a 22nd-place finish.

Returning to Pocono, Earnhardt Jr. was involved in a spin on a restart on lap 72 that also involved Kurt Busch. His car did not take severe damage, however, and despite running mid-pack for most of the second half of the race and running 17th with four laps to go, he ended up finishing in fourth place after many other drivers including the leaders at four laps to go ran out of fuel.

At Watkins Glen, Earnhardt was able to start 7th and finished 11th after running in the top 10 all day, but running out of fuel on the last lap.

Returning to Michigan, Earnhardt Jr. started inside the top 10 and was running in the top 3 in the early part of the race. After battling an ill-handling racecar, he was able to finish 10th.

Earnhardt returned to Bristol looking for his first win at that track since 2004. He qualified 26th and after the first caution came out he would pit. During the pit stop the crew would leave a wheel loose and Earnhardt would pit again. After going a lap down multiple times in the race, he got the Lucky Dog and got back on the lead lap. After moving up to the top 5 later on in the race, he would settle for a 9th-place finish.

The series would take an off week and return to Darlington. Again Earnhardt would have to start mid-pack. He would run outside the top 10 most of the day, but the crew would make right adjustments and they would finish 8th.

The regular season finale would take place at Richmond for the 26th race. Earnhardt would qualify 29th and was puzzled in his interview afterwards. During the race, Earnhardt made steady climbs and by halfway had cracked the top ten. Earnhardt would climb as high as 4th and end up finishing 5th. He made the chase for the 8th time in his career and was seeded 6th for the first Chase race.

Earnhardt Jr. opened the Challenger Round with a 12th-place finish at Chicagoland. At New Hampshire, he ran up front for most of the day, but an emergency fuel stop with two laps to go led him to finish 25th, two laps down, and at the bottom of the Chase cutline. At Dover, despite falling back at a few points, Earnhardt Jr. was locked in a battle with Jamie McMurray for control of the final transfer spot into the Contender Round. He almost did not make it into the next round, with his chances being saved thanks to a caution for Brett Moffitt's crash on lap 357 keeping him from having to make a green flag pit stop to replace a loose wheel. On the last restart, Earnhardt Jr. overtook McMurray on the outside, and finished third, clinching the final transfer spot and bumping McMurray out of the Chase.

At Charlotte, Earnhardt Jr was battling for a position inside the top 10 when he made contact Carl Edwards and hit the wall ending up 29th. At Kansas, Earnhardt Jr had to pit for a loose wheel under green and ended up finishing 21st, 2 laps down. Heading into Talladega, he basically needed to win to advance. He led 61 laps, but he slid his tires coming onto pit road and ended up having to take 2 tires instead of fuel only while others were taking fuel only. He ended up on the front row, heading into the only GWC. But a wreck behind him ended up cutting it short and he ended up 2nd upon a review, eliminating him from the championship. At Martinsville, the week after he was eliminated from Chase Contention, he was strong all race taking home a 4th-place finish at the track.   At Texas the following week Earnhardt recovered from an early spin to finish 6th. Earnhardt Jr. managed to get his 3rd victory of the season at Phoenix, after the race was called for rain. At the season finale at Homestead Earnhardt crashed early in the race, winding up 40th. For the 13th consecutive year, Earnhardt won the NMPA Most Popular Driver Award.

2016

Earnhardt started the 2016 season with a crash in the Sprint Unlimited on lap 23 when Brian Vickers cut down a tire and hit him, damaging the side of his car. This would allow him to finish 15th, four laps down. He then went on to win the first Can-Am Duel race for the second year in a row. In the Daytona 500, he was strong early in the race but with 30 laps to go, he spun off of turn 4 while trying to make a move and hit the SAFER barrier head-on. He would wind up 36th. The following week in Atlanta he was very strong, finishing second.  The following week, at Las Vegas, Earnhardt had a car that was solid all day and ended with an 8th-place finish. At the spring race in Phoenix, he led for a good portion of the race  but stayed out on old tires during overtime. Because of this, he slid his tires on the start, finishing 5th. At Fontana the next week, he struggled throughout the race in the early stages, even being as low as 34th. But in overtime, he made a charge, finishing 11th. At Martinsville, he spun on lap 5, spending 300 laps one lap down. But in the end, he finished 14th and on the lead lap. In Texas, he was strong late in the race, finishing 2nd to Kyle Busch, who won back to back races. At Bristol, he stalled his car on the start, going 2 laps down. But as the race went on, his car came to life and he finished 2nd.

When the Xfinity Series came to Richmond for the running of the Toyota Care 250, Earnhardt would finish 2nd in the first heat race. In the main feature, he would dominate and win the race holding off Ty Dillon for his first Xfinity win since 2010 and his first for JR Motorsports.

On Lap 50 at the spring Talladega race, he got loose in the draft and just like Daytona he hit the wall, damaging his car. This would result in a 40th-place finish. At Kansas, he started 22nd and finished 15th. The following week at Dover, he would start 2nd because qualifying was rained out, but was involved in a late wreck on a botched restart, finishing 32nd.

In the All-Star Race, qualifying was rained out, so he started 10th due to owner points, but was able to finish 3rd.

Concussions end season
In July, Earnhardt was diagnosed with concussion-like symptoms and would miss the second half of the year as a result. He was replaced by Alex Bowman for the New Hampshire 301 and Jeff Gordon at the Brickyard 400 and Pennsylvania 400. On September 2, Earnhardt announced he would sit out the remainder of the season with Gordon and Bowman continuing their replacement roles in the 88. On December 8, 2016, Earnhardt was medically cleared to return to competition in 2017.
Despite missing the second half of the season, Earnhardt Jr. won the NMPA Most Popular Driver Award for the 14th consecutive time.

It was also during this year that Junior would announce his brain would be donated to science to research how his concussions impacted his brain.

2017: Final year

Earnhardt started the 2017 Daytona 500 qualifying second but was wrecked while leading mid-race, and finished 37th. After a string of lackluster finishes, he managed to score a top 5 at the newly repaved Texas. It was his first and only Top 5 finish of the year. On April 25, 2017, Earnhardt announced that 2017 would be his final year driving full-time. Earnhardt Jr. failed to make the Playoffs in his final year, posting a 13th-place finish at Richmond, needing a win to make it in. In his final restrictor plate race at Talladega, Earnhardt would start on the pole and he would miss three big wrecks in the closing laps to finish seventh. In his final career race, Earnhardt started in 24th place and finished in 25th place. He ended up in 21st in points standings. He ended up with only one Top 5, eight Top 10's, two poles, and seven DNF's. However he did win his 15th consecutive and final Most Popular Driver award. Even though 15 straight years of Earnhardt being most popular driver is a NASCAR record, he is second all-time to Bill Elliott, who has 16 most popular driver awards, including 10 straight.

2018–present
After his retirement, Earnhardt began sporadically racing in the Xfinity Series with JR Motorsports. In 2018, he ran the fall Xfinity race at Richmond in the No. 88, after qualifying second, he dominated by leading 96 of the 250 laps, but would ultimately finish fourth after a late race restart. The following year, he contested the Sport Clips Haircuts VFW 200 at Darlington, his first Xfinity start at the track since 1999, driving a No. 8 designed after his father's 1975 Cup car. After starting 15th, he finished fifth; he had originally finished sixth but was promoted one position following Denny Hamlin's disqualification.

In 2020, Earnhardt shared the No. 8 with Daniel Hemric and Jeb Burton. At the 2020 Daytona 500, Earnhardt Jr. was named the Honorary Starter and waved the green flag to officially begin the race. It was soon announced Earnhardt would compete in the Hooters 250 at Homestead-Miami Speedway that year. Earnhardt finished 5th.

It was announced on September 10, 2021, that he would be running in the 2021 version of the Go Bowling 250, with his paint scheme honoring the ones who lost their lives in the 9/11 attacks exactly 20 years ago to the day.

On April 8, 2022, Earnhardt made his Xfinity series start at Martinsville and would ultimately finish 11th after starting 30th. He drove the No. 88 in the race for the first time since 2018.

Earnhardt announced on November 1, 2022, that he would expand his Xfinity schedule from one race to two in 2023, Having Bass Pro Shops sponsor him for one race and Hellman's Mayonnaise sponsoring the other one.

Other racing
On top of his 26 career NASCAR Cup regular season victories, Earnhardt has also won nine exhibition races. He won the 2003, 2004, 2008, 2015, and 2016 Budweiser Duels, the 2000 The Winston, the 2003 and 2008 Budweiser Shootout and the 2012 Sprint Showdown. He finished second in the 1999 IROC race from Michigan International Speedway, barely losing to his father. In 1998, he was one of a select few of drivers invited to race in the NASCAR Thunder/Motegi 500 in Motegi, Japan. He achieved a sixth-place finish in this overseas race.

On April 20, 2022, Earnhardt won on his debut in the iRacing MOONCAR series, racing vintage 1987 Winston Cup stock cars at Talladega in dramatic fashion, flipping across the start/finish line. On September 1, he finished third at the CARS Tour Window World 125 at North Wilkesboro. On November 20, Earnhardt finished ninth at the South Carolina 400 at Florence Motor Speedway.

Team ownership

JR Motorsports

Earnhardt is a co-owner of JR Motorsports with his older sister Kelley Earnhardt Miller, a NASCAR Xfinity and Truck Series team. In 2014, the team won their first NASCAR national championship, as Chase Elliott drove the No. 9 NAPA Auto Parts car to the 2014 NASCAR Nationwide Series championship. In 2015, JR Motorsports began fielding a part-time team in the Truck Series, with Cole Custer driving the No. 00 Haas Automation Chevrolet Silverado in 10 races. Kasey Kahne also drove part-time in the Truck Series, with the two drivers winning at Gateway Motorsports Park and Charlotte, respectively.  JR Motorsports also has a very successful regional late model program, with Josh Berry capturing the 2012 Motor Mile Championship in the Whelen All-American series. Berry was also able to win a second track championship at Hickory Motor Speedway.

Chance 2 Motorsports

In 2003, Earnhardt and his stepmother Teresa founded Chance 2 Motorsports as a separate entity from DEI. The company hired Martin Truex Jr. to drive the No. 8 in the 2004 and 2005 Busch Series season, and he would go on to win the championship both years. Truex won twelve races for the team and Earnhardt added four more, three of which were in 2003. The company would later endure financial struggles and go out of business in 2006 and Truex, Earnhardt, and the No. 8 car returned to DEI.

Broadcasting career
In 2016, Earnhardt was a guest analyst in NASCAR Cup and Xfinity race broadcasts on Fox and NBC.

Earnhardt joined the NASCAR on NBC broadcasting team as a color commentator for the 2018 season. He made his debut on NBCSN's NASCAR America on March 12, 2018, joining Leigh Diffey, Jeff Burton, and his former crew chief Steve Letarte. In his debut at the 2018 Overton's 400 at Chicagoland Speedway, he coined his catchphrase: "Slide job!" when Kyle Busch and Kyle Larson battled for the lead on the final lap.

Business interests
Earnhardt owns Hammerhead Entertainment, a media production company that created and produced the TV show Back in the Day, which aired on SPEED. Hammerhead also produced "Shifting Gears", a show on ESPN2 that chronicled his 2008 team switch.

He was partners with a group of investors who were building Alabama Motorsports Park, a Dale Earnhardt Jr. Speedway. The track was to be located near Mobile, Alabama and would feature stock car racing, kart racing and a road course. This would have joined with his partial ownership of Paducah International Raceway. 

, Earnhardt has his own signature line of eyeglass frames, partnering with NY Eye Inc. In August 2012, he entered the automobile dealer business, opening Dale Earnhardt Jr. Chevrolet and Dale Earnhardt Jr. Buick-GMC-Cadillac in Tallahassee, Florida in association with car owner Rick Hendrick.

Earnhardt co-owns the Whiskey River Beer and Wings restaurants in Charlotte, North Carolina, and at the Charlotte Airport.

Earnhardt is also the co-owner of FilterTime, alongside former NASCAR driver Blake Koch.

Earnhardt has been a long time sim racer. In November 2020, he officially joined iRacing as an executive director and is part of the management committee.

On January 9, 2023, a consortium consisting of Earnhardt's DEJ Management, Jeff Burton Autosports, Inc., Kevin Harvick Incorporated, and Trackhouse Racing Team purchased the CARS Tour.

In popular media

Films
He was featured in the video Playboy: Celebrity Photographers (2003) where he photographed The Dahm Triplets. He appeared in the 2006 film Talladega Nights: The Ballad of Ricky Bobby. In the movie, he is seen asking Ricky Bobby (Will Ferrell) for his autograph, and tells Ricky "don't tell any of the other drivers." There is also a deleted scene on the DVD where he calls Ricky a "dirty liar" and asks him for money he owed him. The No. 8 car also appeared in Herbie: Fully Loaded in the final race where Herbie overtook him. His No. 88 car also appeared in the 2011 film Transformers: Dark of the Moon as the vehicle form of Roadbuster, one of a trio of NASCAR stock cars equipped with armor and heavy machine guns called the "Wreckers" (the other Wreckers were based on the No. 42 and No. 48 cars driven respectively by Juan Pablo Montoya and Jimmie Johnson). The Wrecker versions of these cars circled the track during the opening pace laps of the 2011 Daytona 500 (Josh Duhamel, Rosie Huntington-Whiteley and Michael Bay were also the grand marshals for that race, in which Earnhardt crashed on lap 203 after making contact with Ryan Newman).

Television
He hosted Back in the Day, a show that recapped races from the 1960s and 1970s with trivia and information. The show debuted on the Speed Channel on February 6, 2007. He has also appeared in an episode of the TV show Yes, Dear. He has also been on two episodes of MTV Cribs. The first episode originally aired in 2001. The second episode featuring the Western town Earnhardt built originally aired in 2009. His production company Hammerhead Entertainment also assisted in creating a DirecTV special called "Fast Lane For Fun", in which Earnhardt's Whisky River was shown in one episode. In 2010, he appeared in an episode of Shaq Vs., where he was racing against Shaquille O'Neal. In 2013 Earnhardt made an appearance on the show Fast N' Loud where he requested Richard Rawlings from Gas Monkey Garage to build him a custom-built car for a road trip vacation. He has a home renovation show for the DIY Network called "Renovation Realities: Dale Jr. and Amy". He later voiced Chip Racerson Jr. in one episode of the 2013 animated series Teen Titans Go! called "Teen Titans Vroom!" In 2020, Earnhardt hosted Lost Speedways, a television documentary series that saw him travel to and explore abandoned racetracks across the country.

Voice acting
 His voice is featured in the video game Scarface: The World is Yours.
 He voiced himself in Disney/Pixar's movie Cars as a No. 8 car (painted in resemblance to Earnhardt's actual car) named "Junior" with the DEI logo on the hood. The Budweiser logos were censored from the No. 8 to prevent alcoholic advertising to gain a "G" (General) rating.
 His voice was used for the character Chase Davis in an episode of the Disney Channel's Handy Manny. Chase helps Manny compete in the Wood Valley 500 auto race in "Handy Manny's Big Race".
 He played himself in "The Hangover: Part Tubbs", a 2013 episode of The Cleveland Show.

Music
Until its rebranding in 2015, the band Dale Earnhardt Jr. Jr. was named after Earnhardt. Earnhardt is a noted fan of Ellicott City, Maryland rock band The Dangerous Summer and produced the music video for the band's song "Ghosts".

Music video appearances
He has made appearances in several music videos, including:
 "Show Me What You Got" with Jay-Z along with Danica Patrick.
 Matthew Good Band's video for Anti-Pop, as he is friends with band frontman, Matthew Good.
 Sheryl Crow's "Steve McQueen" music video
 Trace Adkins video entitled "Rough and Ready".
 3 Doors Down's "The Road I'm On" along with Tony Stewart.
 O.A.R.'s "Right on Time".
 Nickelback's "Rockstar".
 "Warrior" by Kid Rock.

Radio
Earnhardt hosted a show on Sirius XM Radio's Sirius XM Sports Nation called Dale Earnhardt Jr.'s Unrestricted.

Beginning the 2013 season, Earnhardt's Hammerhead Entertainment and his Dirty Mo Radio podcasting network began producing The Dale Jr. Download, a weekly podcast which recaps his race weekend. It was hosted by Taylor Zarzour and Mike Davis up until the end of the 2016 season. For the 2017 season Dale Jr and his road manager, Tyler Overstreet replaced Davis and Zarzour as the hosts of The Dale Jr. Download. However, Davis continued to make an occasional appearance on the podcast. Since 2018, edited versions of The Dale Jr. Download have aired on NBCSN featuring interviews with current and former NASCAR personalities.

Video games
Earnhardt has been featured on the cover of NASCAR-themed video games twice; he appeared on the cover of EA Sports' NASCAR Thunder 2003, and also was voted to be on the cover of NASCAR The Game: Inside Line in 2012.

Earnhardt is also a streamer for iRacing.com on Twitch.tv

Politics
In a 2004 interview with Mike Wallace (not fellow competitor) on 60 Minutes, Earnhardt revealed himself to be a Republican and a supporter of President George W. Bush. Despite this, he took his crew out to see the film Fahrenheit 9/11 earlier that year, explaining, "I like hearing both sides of the argument. I thought the movie was well done. But my dad was a Republican, and I'm a Republican, and so [it's] not that I came out of there going, 'I ain't voting for Bush again.' That didn't happen, and I didn't expect that to happen. I just wanted to go and enjoy the movie."

Earnhardt is a longtime opponent of the modern display of the Confederate flag at NASCAR events. He wrote in his 2001 autobiography Driver #8 about his experience being asked about the flag in a Q&A at Richmond International Raceway (now Richmond Raceway) the previous year. "I think it means something different to me than it does to y'all..." he responded. He has distanced himself from race fans who display the flag, explaining, "It never really was me." In 2006, Earnhardt told Dan Wetzel of Yahoo! Sports: "We live in a country where you can speak freely and do as you may. I don't know (if) what that flag stands for is the same for me as it is the guy who might have it flying out there. I am not going to agree with everything everybody does all my life. So I don't have any control over it." Following the Charleston church shooting in 2015, Earnhardt told reporters: "I think it's offensive to an entire race. It does nothing for anybody to be there flying, so I don't see any reason. It belongs in the history books and that's about it."

In January 2009, Earnhardt expressed enthusiasm following President Barack Obama's inauguration: "I'm as excited as everybody else is about him. I wish I had been able to go to the inauguration. I would love to meet him. That would be a great honor."

In April 2012, Earnhardt became a partner of the American Coalition for Clean Coal Electricity. He addressed delegates to the 2012 Democratic National Convention at Charlotte Motor Speedway on behalf of the coalition. In 2014, Earnhardt recorded an advertisement for America's Power, encouraging voter turnout for the U.S. elections that year.

In May 2012, Earnhardt singled out Republican Representative Jack Kingston of Georgia while speaking against an amendment to a defense bill that would prohibit the military from funding sponsorships in professional sports.

In January 2017, Earnhardt revealed that his family immigrated from Germany in the 1770s to escape religious persecution, saying "America is created by immigrants." In August, he spoke out against hatred, bigotry and racism following the attacks in Charlottesville, Virginia and Barcelona, Spain. In September, after protests of the U.S. national anthem gained traction following criticism from President Donald Trump, Earnhardt expressed support for peaceful protesters, quoting former president John F. Kennedy on Twitter: "Those who make peaceful revolution impossible will make violent revolution inevitable."

Personal life 

Earnhardt is a passionate Washington Commanders fan and has been known to have their scores relayed to him during races. "During the race season, [if] I'm under caution, I'm getting stats and numbers told to me over the radio during the race," Earnhardt said. "I've got to know. I can't concentrate on what I'm doing if I don't know what the Redskins are doing. My fans tell me if I lose, it ruins their week. But if the Redskins lose, it ruins my week." Earnhardt once dreamed of playing football for the Commanders, but states that he "wasn't built" for it. "I was 5–3 (5'3", 160 cm) when I got my driver's license at the age of 16," he said, "so I wasn't going to make much of a football player." He currently owns a Learjet 60 private jet with the tail number N8JR.

Earnhardt also owns a yard of wrecked race cars on a property in North Carolina. Some of the most notable cars include Juan Pablo Montoya's 2012 Daytona 500 car that collided with a jet dryer, David Gilliland's 2014 5-hour Energy 400 car that was destroyed in a violent impact with the tri-oval wall, and Earnhardt's own 2014 Duck Commander 500 car that was wrecked from incidental contact with wet infield grass on lap 12 that cut a tire.

On June 17, 2015, Earnhardt announced his engagement to his longtime girlfriend Amy Reimann. After winning his 14th Most Popular Driver Award in 2016, he announced their marriage would take place on New Year's Eve. They got married at Richard Childress' Childress Vineyards in Lexington, North Carolina.

In March 2016, Earnhardt announced that he plans to donate his brain for concussion research when he dies.

In October 2017, Earnhardt revealed that he and Amy were expecting their first child. Their daughter, Isla Rose Earnhardt, was born on April 30, 2018. In March 2020, Earnhardt revealed that he and Amy were expecting their second child. The couple welcomed Nicole Loraine Earnhardt on October 12, 2020.

On April 22, 2019, Brenda Jackson, Earnhardt's mother, died at the age of 65 after years of battling cancer. She had served as an accounting specialist for JR Motorsports since 2004.

Earnhardt is a supporter of the Make-A-Wish Foundation and  has granted over 250 wishes.

On August 15, 2019, a Cessna Citation Latitude private jet carrying Earnhardt, his wife Amy, daughter Isla Rose, and dog Gus was involved in a bounced landing at Elizabethton Municipal Airport in Elizabethton, Tennessee and caught fire. None of the passengers were seriously injured. He announced on Twitter about a week after the accident that he still intended to participate in the Xfinity Series one-off entry at Darlington the week afterwards, even though his lower back had gotten sizeable bruises and swelling. Earnhardt finished fifth in the Darlington race after having sufficiently recovered to be taking part in the event, confirming before the race he was feeling great and had been assured there was no risk for him in taking part.

Racing record

NASCAR
(key) (Bold – Pole position awarded by qualifying time. Italics – Pole position earned by points standings or practice time. * – Most laps led. ** – All laps led.)

Cup Series

Daytona 500

Xfinity Series

* Season still in progress
1 Ineligible for series points

International Race of Champions
(key) (Bold – Pole position. * – Most laps led.)

24 Hours of Daytona
(key)

References

External links

JR Nation

 
1974 births
Living people
24 Hours of Daytona drivers
American Le Mans Series drivers
American people of German descent
Dale Earnhardt Inc. drivers
Dale Jr.
Hendrick Motorsports drivers
International Race of Champions drivers
JR Motorsports drivers
Motorsport announcers
NASCAR drivers
NASCAR team owners
NASCAR Xfinity Series champions
North Carolina Republicans
Oak Ridge Military Academy alumni
People from Kannapolis, North Carolina
Philanthropists from North Carolina
Racing drivers from Charlotte, North Carolina
Racing drivers from North Carolina
Richard Childress Racing drivers
Survivors of aviation accidents or incidents
NASCAR Hall of Fame inductees